Konstantin Vasilyevich Demenko (born 11 August 1975) is a Russian professional football coach and a former player. He is an assistant manager for FC Neftekhimik Nizhnekamsk.

Playing career
He played 13 seasons in the Russian Football National League for PFC Spartak Nalchik and FC KAMAZ Naberezhnye Chelny.

External links
 

1975 births
Living people
Russian footballers
Association football midfielders
FC Asmaral Moscow players
PFC Spartak Nalchik players
FC KAMAZ Naberezhnye Chelny players
Russian football managers
Sportspeople from Kanagawa Prefecture